Pleydell may refer to:

Edmund Pleydell, MP for Wootton Bassett
Edmund Morton Pleydell, MP for Dorchester and Dorset
Gabriel Pleydell ( 1519–1591), English politician
John Pleydell (1601–1693), English politician
Josiah Pleydell (c.1641–1707), Archdeacon of Chichester
William Pleydell, English lawyer and politician, brother of the above
Pleydell baronets